XHEDL-FM is a radio station on 89.7 FM in Hermosillo, Sonora. The station is owned by Radio S.A. and carries a pop format known as Activa 89.7.

History
XHEDL began as XEDL-AM 1250 in 1944, though its concession history dates only to 1958. It was owned by Francisco Vidal and later by Eufemia Esquer de Vidal.

In 1980, the station was among the first to be represented by Grupo Radio Comunicación, S.A. This formed the basis for what became known as Radio S.A. After Esquer de Vidal's death, the station was transferred from her estate to Carlos de Jesús Quiñones Armendáriz, the owner of Radio S.A.

In 2012, XEDL moved to FM on 89.7 MHz and became known as "DL Radio 89.7, La Gran Diferencia", taking its slogan from sister station XEDA-AM in Mexico City. At the time the station primarily had a talk format. At the end of 2013, XHEDL ditched its talk format for pop in Spanish and became known as Activa 89.7.

References

Radio stations in Sonora
Mexican radio stations with expired concessions